This page details the all-time statistics, records, and other achievements pertaining to the Sacramento Kings.

Individual records

Franchise leaders 
Bold denotes still active with team.

Italic denotes still active but not with team.

Points scored (regular season)

(as of the end of the 2021–22 season)
 Oscar Robertson (22,009)
 Jack Twyman (15,840)
 Mitch Richmond (12,070)
 Tiny Archibald (10,894)
 Sam Lacey (9,895)
 DeMarcus Cousins (9,894)
 Peja Stojakovic (9,498)
 Jerry Lucas (9,107)
 Eddie Johnson (9,027)
 Scott Wedman (9,002)
 Chris Webber (8,843)
 Wayne Embry (8,486)
 Mike Bibby (8,384)
 Adrian Smith (8,085)
 Tom Van Arsdale (7,278)
 Bobby Wanzer (6,924)
 Wayman Tisdale (6,808)
 Bob Davies (6,594)
 Otis Birdsong (6,539)
 Buddy Hield (6,502)

Other statistics (regular season) 
(as of November 10, 2022)

Individual awards

NBA MVP
Oscar Robertson – 1964

NBA Rookie of the Year
Maurice Stokes – 1956
Oscar Robertson – 1961
Jerry Lucas – 1964
Phil Ford – 1979
Tyreke Evans – 2010

NBA Sixth Man of the Year
Bobby Jackson – 2003

NBA Coach of the Year
Phil Johnson – 1975
Cotton Fitzsimmons – 1979

NBA Executive of the Year
Joe Axelson – 1973
Geoff Petrie – 1999, 2001

J. Walter Kennedy Citizenship Award
Vlade Divac – 2000

All-NBA First Team
Bob Davies – 1949, 1950, 1951, 1952
Oscar Robertson – 1961, 1962, 1963, 1964, 1965, 1966, 1967, 1968, 1969
Jerry Lucas – 1965, 1966, 1968
Nate Archibald – 1973, 1975, 1976
Chris Webber – 2001

All-NBA Second Team
Arnie Risen – 1949
Bobby Wanzer – 1952, 1953, 1954
Bob Davies – 1953
Maurice Stokes – 1956, 1957, 1958
Jack Twyman – 1960, 1962
Jerry Lucas – 1964, 1967
Oscar Robertson – 1970
Nate Archibald – 1972
Phil Ford – 1979
Otis Birdsong – 1981
Mitch Richmond – 1994, 1995, 1997
Chris Webber – 1999, 2002, 2003
Peja Stojaković – 2004
DeMarcus Cousins – 2015, 2016

All-NBA Third Team
Mitch Richmond – 1996, 1998
Chris Webber – 2000

NBA All-Defensive First Team
Doug Christie – 2003
Ron Artest – 2006

NBA All-Defensive Second Team
Norm Van Lier – 1971
Brian Taylor – 1977
Scott Wedman – 1980
Doug Christie – 2001, 2002, 2004

NBA All-Rookie First Team
Jerry Lucas – 1964
Ron Behagen – 1974
Scott Wedman – 1975
Phil Ford – 1979
Kenny Smith – 1988
Lionel Simmons – 1991
Brian Grant – 1995
Jason Williams – 1999
Tyreke Evans – 2010
DeMarcus Cousins – 2011
Buddy Hield – 2017
Marvin Bagley III – 2019
Tyrese Haliburton – 2021

NBA All-Rookie Second Team
Travis Mays – 1991
Walt Williams – 1993
Tyus Edney – 1996
Hedo Türkoğlu – 2001
Isaiah Thomas – 2012
Willie Cauley-Stein – 2016
Bogdan Bogdanović – 2018

NBA All-Star Weekend

NBA All-Star Game
 Bob Davies – 1951, 1952, 1953, 1954
 Arnie Risen – 1952, 1953, 1954, 1955
 Bobby Wanzer – 1952, 1953, 1954, 1955, 1956
 Jack Coleman – 1955
 Maurice Stokes – 1956, 1957, 1958
 Richie Regan – 1957
 Jack Twyman – 1957, 1958, 1959, 1960, 1962, 1963
 Wayne Embry – 1961, 1962, 1963, 1964, 1965
 Oscar Robertson – 1961, 1962, 1963, 1964, 1965, 1966, 1967, 1968, 1969, 1970
 Jerry Lucas – 1964, 1965, 1966, 1967, 1968, 1969
 Adrian Smith – 1966
 Tom Van Arsdale – 1970, 1971, 1972
 Johnny Green – 1971
 Nate Archibald – 1973, 1975, 1976
 Sam Lacey – 1975
 Scott Wedman – 1976, 1980
 Otis Birdsong – 1979, 1980, 1981
 Mitch Richmond – 1993, 1994, 1995, 1996, 1997, 1998
 Chris Webber – 2000, 2001, 2002, 2003
 Vlade Divac – 2001
 Peja Stojaković – 2002, 2003, 2004
 Brad Miller – 2004
 DeMarcus Cousins – 2015, 2016, 2017
 De'Aaron Fox – 2023
 Domantas Sabonis – 2023

NBA All-Star Game Western head coach
 Bobby Wanzer – 1957
 Rick Adelman – 2001, 2003

NBA All-Star Game MVP
Oscar Robertson – 1961,1964,1969
Jerry Lucas – 1965
Adrian Smith -1966
 Mitch Richmond – 1995

Franchise record for championships

References

records
National Basketball Association accomplishments and records by team